Branislava "Brana" Vlasic (Serbian Cyrillic: Бранислава "Брана" Влашић) (born 5 November 1990 in Novi Knezevac, Vojvodina, SR Serbia, Yugoslavia) is a Serbian-American table tennis player.

Brana started playing at age 6 in Serbia. At 13, she relocated to San Diego. From 2007, Brana was trained by the 1971 Table Tennis World Champion, Stellan Bengtsson. Throughout her junior career, Brana was one of the highest ranked US players.

While pursuing her political science degree at the University of California, San Diego, she played for the University's table tennis team. The National Collegiate Table Tennis Association awarded her Female Athlete of 2013.

Brana is a longtime member of the San Diego Table Tennis Club. She has worked to promote awareness of table tennis in the US among children and adults.

References

Serbian female table tennis players
People from Novi Kneževac
1990 births
Living people
American female table tennis players
Serb diaspora sportspeople
Serbian emigrants to the United States
21st-century American women